Aparajita Goppi is an Indian politician. In 2013 she became a Central Committee member of the All India Forward Bloc. As of 2009 she was a secretariat member of the party in West Bengal. As of 2000 she was the highest-ranking woman in the party in the state. She is the chairwoman of the All India Agragami Mahila Samity, the women's wing of the party. She was a Member of the Legislative Assembly of West Bengal between 1977 and 1991.

As a student at Suniti Academy in Cooch Behar she led students in struggle for the right to observe Netaji Subhash Chandra Bose's birthday.

Goppi contested the 1972 West Bengal Legislative Assembly election from the Cooch Behar North seat. She finished in second place with 19,846 votes (40.07%). She contested and won the same seat in the 1977 assembly election. She obtained 32,792 votes (63.07%). Goppi retained the Cooch Behar North seat in 1982, getting 46,810 votes (57.15%), and in the 1987 election, obtaining 49,172 votes (54.74%).

References

All India Forward Bloc politicians
Year of birth missing (living people)
Place of birth missing (living people)
Members of the West Bengal Legislative Assembly
Women in West Bengal politics
Living people
21st-century Indian women politicians
21st-century Indian politicians